Pyramid G2-a is the name of the satellite pyramid of Khafre. The structure was located on the south side of the main pyramid, along its centerline, and likely housed a statue dedicated to the pharaoh's ka. The structure contains two descending passages: The first opened on the north side of the pyramid and terminated in a small chamber. The second passage, discovered in 1960 by Abdel Hafez Abd el-'Al, is located four meters to the west of the ruin, ending in a dead end with a niche which contained pieces of ritualistic furniture.

It was likely the Emir Karakoush of the Ayyubid Sultanate, serving in the 12th century under Saladin, who dismantled much of the pyramid, using the stones for other construction projects. After centuries of exposure to the elements and further stone robbing, almost nothing remains of G2-a other than some core blocks and the outline of the foundation.

See also 
 List of Egyptian pyramids

References

Bibliography

External links
 Pyramid G2-a at Digital Giza

Pyramids in Egypt
Pyramids of the Fourth Dynasty of Egypt